CSHP may refer to:

Canadian Society of Hospital Pharmacists, a professional organization representing the interests of hospital pharmacists in Canada
Central solar heating plants